Antropov is a surname. Notable people with the surname include:

 Aleksey Antropov (1716–1795), Russian painter
 Alexander Antropov (born 1990), Russian ice hockey player
 Andrey Antropov (born 1967), Russian badminton player
 Egor Antropov (born 1992), Russian ice hockey defenceman
 Ilya Antropov (born 1997), Russian football player
 Nik Antropov (born 1980), Kazakh-Canadian ice hockey centre

See also
 Oļegs Antropovs (born 1947), Latvian volleyball player